New Zealand competed at the 2014 Winter Olympics in Sochi, Russia from 7 to 23 February 2014. The team consisted of 15 competitors in five sports. Only three members had prior Olympic Games experience (Dobbin, Sandford and Sinclair).

For the sixth games in a row, the country did not win any medals. The best result was a fourth place to Jossi Wells in the men's halfpipe.

Alpine skiing

Freestyle skiing 

Men

Women

Skeleton

Snowboarding 

Qualification Legend: QF – Qualify directly to final; QS – Qualify to semifinal

Speed skating

References

External links 
New Zealand at the 2014 Winter Olympics

Nations at the 2014 Winter Olympics
2014
Winter Olympics